Tweakers (formerly called Tweakers.net) is a Dutch technology website featuring news and information about hardware, software, games and the Internet. The name is derived from the verb "tweaking", which is a word geeks use to refer to optimisation of hardware.

Tweakers has grown substantially since its conception. Nowadays, it publishes news, reviews, features and video reports about technology subjects, with a strong focus on the Netherlands and Belgium. 

Tweakers has more features for the computer enthusiast, such as reviews, bi-monthly Best Buy guides, a classifieds section for jobs and used hardware, the Pricewatch and the Shop Survey, among others. While the majority of the reviews are written in Dutch, several articles covering non-standard topics are translated into English.

Tweakers currently has more than 1.000.000 members and its forum has over 29 million posts. It has won several awards, including "(Dutch) website of the year" in 2009, 2010, 2011, 2012, 2013 and 2014.

History 
The website was founded in 1998 by Femme Taken, a computer enthusiast, under the name World of Tweaking as a student's hobby project to offer a Dutch alternative to hardware review sites like Tom's Hardware Guide.

As of March 2006, Tweakers has been taken over by the Dutch media conglomerate VNU, now known as The Nielsen Company. However, VNU Media has become owner of the website after The Nielsen Company had sold its Business Media division to private equity firm 3i.

In October 2012, Tweakers launched a new design, designed by Femme Taken, the founder. However, the new design met with criticism from their community. A couple of days later, Tweakers launched a new feature which enabled the community to change the appearance of the website.

The current responsive design was introduced on 6 January 2014. The Android and iOS apps were removed from their respective stores on 7 October 2014.

In February 2014 Tweakers significantly improved the price comparison tool for sim only contracts.

In June 2014 Tweakers added prices of Belgian webshops to the Pricewatch, which now shows prices from Dutch and Belgian webshops.

In April 2015 Tweakers launched a completely new logo to be uniformly used throughout the website.

Gathering of Tweakers 
An important area of the site is the forum. Tweakers's forum is known as the Gathering of Tweakers (often abbreviated as GoT). The forum is mainly focused on technical subjects and tries to maintain a relatively high standard of posting. It has a fairly strong moderation policy, especially when compared to other online discussion forums. Users of the forum are strongly urged to read the FAQ and to have invested a fair amount of his/her own time into finding an answer, either on GoT using the search tools, or anywhere else on the Internet, before asking a question.

Tweakers Awards 
Tweakers Awards (formerly known as "Tweakers Gouden Steeksleutel Awards" 2007 to 2011) is a contest in which members can choose the best products from different technology categories.

References

External links 
 

Computing websites
Dutch-language websites
Dutch news websites
3i Group companies
Internet properties established in 1998
1998 establishments in the Netherlands